Series 4 of police drama Rush premiered on 1 September 2011 with a double episode. The fourth instalment continues to follow the lives of the officers employed with the prestigious Tactical Response Unit in Victoria, Australia.
Antony Starr joins the main cast as Senior Sergeant Charlie Lewis, the new boss. Senior Constable Michael Sandrelli (Ashley Zukerman) is fired from TR to go on an undercover mission.

Cast

Regular

 Rodger Corser as Senior Sergeant Lawson Blake
 Callan Mulvey as Sergeant Brendan "Josh" Joshua
 Jolene Anderson as Sergeant Shannon Henry
 Antony Starr as Senior Sergeant Charlie Lewis (Antony Starr movies)
 Nicole da Silva as Senior Constable Stella Dagostino
 Ashley Zukerman as Senior Constable Michael Sandrelli (until episode 8)
 Kevin Hofbauer as Constable Christian Tapu
 Samuel Johnson as Intelligence Officer Leon Broznic
 Catherine McClements as Superintendent Kerry Vincent

Recurring
 Jane Allsop as Tash Button
 Ella Shenman as Minka Button
 Ian Meadows as James Vincent
 Emily Wheaton as Amber Cushing
 Elle Mandalis as Anna Vargas
Peter Hardy as Doug Rainey
 Mark Leonard Winter as Liam Rainey

Episodes 
{| class="wikitable plainrowheaders" style="width: 100%; margin-right: 0;"
|-
! style="background: #ffa812; color: #ffffff"| No. in series
! style="background: #ffa812; color: #ffffff;"| No. in season
! style="background: #ffa812; color: #ffffff;"| Title
! style="background: #ffa812; color: #ffffff;"| Directed by
! style="background: #ffa812; color: #ffffff;"| Written by
! style="background: #ffa812; color: #ffffff;"| Australian viewers (million)
! style="background: #ffa812; color: #ffffff;"| Rank (weekly)
! style="background: #ffa812; color: #ffffff;"| Original air date
|-

|}

References

External links 
 
 
 List of 

2011 Australian television seasons
Police procedural television series